McCarey is a surname. Notable people with the surname include:

 Aaron McCarey (born 1992), Irish footballer
 Kevin McCarey, American filmmaker and author
 Leo McCarey (1898–1969), American film director, screenwriter, and producer
 Ray McCarey (1904–1948), American film director

See also
 McCary